WRAN (97.3 FM; "Groovy 97.3") is a radio station licensed to Taylorville, Illinois.  The station broadcasts an oldies format and is owned by Miller Communications, Inc.

Until August 1, 2014, the station was WTIM-FM, with a news/talk format. The format and WTIM call letters moved to 870 AM at that time; the oldies format and WRAN call letters were then moved from 98.3 FM (which became country music station WSVZ).

Previous logo

References

External links

Oldies radio stations in the United States
RAN
Radio stations established in 1998
1998 establishments in Illinois